Paracleros biguttulus, the common dusky dart, is a butterfly in the family Hesperiidae. It is found in Sierra Leone, Liberia, Ivory Coast, Ghana, Nigeria, Cameroon, the Democratic Republic of the Congo, Uganda, western Kenya, western Tanzania and Zambia. The habitat consists of forests.

References

Butterflies described in 1890
Erionotini
Butterflies of Africa